The Indrajit Namchoom Arunachal League, or Arunachal Super League, is the top division of football in Indian state of Arunachal Pradesh. The league is organised by Arunachal Pradesh Football Association the governing body of football in the state under AIFF affiliation.

History
Its inaugural season started with 7 teams in 2017. All the matches were played at a single venue, Rajiv Gandhi Stadium in Naharlagun. Gora Makik won the first season by beating Todo United.

Teams

List of winners
Gora makik SC (3): 2017, 2019, 2020

See also
Arunachal Pradesh Football Association

References

Football in Arunachal Pradesh
Football leagues in India